Cocoricò is a nightclub in Riccione, Province of Rimini, Italy. Open since 1989, it has become one of Italy's largest dance venues. DJ Mag ranked it at 16th place in its 2015 World Top 100 clubs list. The nightclub has a capacity of 2,500 people.

In the late 2010s, various disputes with the tax authorities and judicial vicissitudes have led to a crisis in the management company. On June 4, 2019, the court declared inadmissible the request for a settlement with creditors filed by the management of Piramide (owned by Fabrizio De Meis). With the second sentence of 11 June, the bankruptcy court rejects the composition with creditors, sanctioning the bankruptcy of the company and the closure of the disco.

Following the new purchase of the place by Enrico Galli and Antonella Bonicalzi it was announced that the disco would reopen its doors on April 26, 2020, with the name of Cocco. The change of name was necessary because the Cocoricò, Titilla and Memorabilia trademarks had been seized by the Rimini court and put up for judicial auction. In the end, due to the new regulations for the prevention of COVID-19, the reopening was postponed until a later date. On July 10 the news appears that the brands were purchased by an entrepreneur who wanted to remain anonymous, but then a video appeared on the official social networks of the club which made one suppose that the new owners of the Piramide company had bought them back. The videos suggest that the disco will keep its original name: Cocoricò. In fact, the video reads: Now I can tell You My name: Cocoricò.

The club re-opened as Cocoricò in November 2022 with three rooms: Piramide (techno/tech-house),  T Room (hard techno) and Titilla (house)

Notes 

Nightclubs in Italy
1989 establishments in Italy
Event venues established in 1989
Electronic dance music venues